The Portuguese local elections of 1989 took place on 17 December. The elections consisted of three separate elections in the 305 Portuguese municipalities, the election for the Municipal Chambers, whose winner is elected mayor, another election for the Municipal Assembly and a last one for the lower-level Parish Assembly, whose winner is elected parish president. This last was held separately in the more than 4,200 parishes around the country.

For the first time since democracy was restored, the center-left/left-wing parties won a nationwide local election. The Socialist Party won, also for the 1st time, the status of largest local party, a title the Socialists would hold on until 2001, and gained control in many big cities across the country, like Lisbon and Porto. In Lisbon, the PS leader, Jorge Sampaio, in a coalition with CDU, defeated the PSD/CDS candidate, Marcelo Rebelo de Sousa, by a 49% to 42% margin. The Socialists had a net gain of 41 cities, and won important cities like Guimarães, Coimbra, Faro and Vila Nova de Gaia.

The Social Democrats (PSD), were the big losers of the elections. The party lost its status as the largest local party and suffered heavy losses across the country, particularly in the big cities. The PSD lost a total of 35 cities, although was able to increase its share of the vote to 35%. The results contrast with the landslide election victory the PSD won in the 1987 general elections. Many of Cavaco Silva's government policies such as privatizations, which was creating some unemployment, or the tensions with some workers unions, like the Police protests in April 1989, may have had a negative effect on the PSD chances.

The Democratic Unity Coalition (CDU) gained 3 cities, compared with 1985, and maintained their control in the Alentejo area. Nonetheless, the Communist/Green coalition suffered a big drop in its share of vote, dropping 6% to around 13%. The CDU was able to hold on to their bastions of Beja, Évora and Almada.

The Democratic and Social Centre (CDS), like PSD, had a very poor showing winning 20 cities, a drop of 7 cities. The party lost some important cities to either the PS or PSD, such as Póvoa de Varzim, Leiria and Viseu. At the same time, CDS made several coalitions with the PS in Azores and Madeira, and, together, the PS/CDS coalition won a combined total of 3 cities. Other smaller parties also made gains, like the UDP which gained Machico, Madeira islands, from the PSD

Turnout in these elections was lower compared with 4 years ago, as 60.9% of the electorate cast a ballot.

Parties 
The main political forces involved in the election were:

 Democratic and Social Centre (CDS)1, 2
 Democratic Unity Coalition (CDU)1
 Socialist Party (PS)1
 Social Democratic Party (PSD) 2

1 The PS formed coalitions with CDS, CDU and MDP/CDE in several municipalities.
2 The PS formed coalitions with CDS and PPM in some municipalities.

Results

Municipal Councils

National summary of votes and seats

|-
! rowspan="2" colspan=2 style="background-color:#E9E9E9" align=left|Parties
! rowspan="2" style="background-color:#E9E9E9" align=right|Votes
! rowspan="2" style="background-color:#E9E9E9" align=right|%
! rowspan="2" style="background-color:#E9E9E9" align=right|±pp swing
! rowspan="2" style="background-color:#E9E9E9" align=right|Candidacies
! colspan="2" style="background-color:#E9E9E9" align="center"|Councillors
! colspan="2" style="background-color:#E9E9E9" align="center"|Mayors
|- style="background-color:#E9E9E9"
! style="background-color:#E9E9E9" align="center"|Total
! style="background-color:#E9E9E9" align="center"|±
! style="background-color:#E9E9E9" align="center"|Total
! style="background-color:#E9E9E9" align="center"|±
|-
| 
|1,599,483||32.40||5.0||||728||154||116||37
|-
| 
|1,554,245||31.49||2.5||||780||39||113||36
|-
| 
|633,693||12.84||6.6||||253||50||50||3
|-
| 
|451,126||9.14||0.6||||179||43||20||7
|-
|style="width: 10px" bgcolor=#FF9900 align="center" | 
|align=left|PSD / CDS / PPM
|193,161||3.91||—||||13||—||1||—
|-
|style="width: 10px" bgcolor=#FF66FF align="center" | 
|align=left|PS / CDU / MDP/CDE
|180,760||3.66||—||||9||—||1||—
|-
| 
|38,565||0.78||4.0||||4||35||0||3
|-
|style="width: 10px" bgcolor=#FF66FF align="center" | 
|align=left|PS / CDS
|34,912||0.71||—||||15||—||3||—
|-
|style="width: 10px" bgcolor=red align="center" | 
|align=left|CDU / PRD
|23,026||0.47||—||||5||—||0||—
|-
| 
|21,819||0.44||0.2||||0||0||0||0
|-
|style="width: 10px" bgcolor=#E2062C align="center" | 
|align=left|People's Democratic Union
|15,876||0.32||0.3||||4||1||1||1
|-
| 
|11,384||0.23||—||||1||—||0||—
|-
| 
|7,189 ||0.15||0.1||||1||1||0||0
|-
|style="width: 10px" bgcolor=darkred align="center" | 
|align=left|MDP/CDE / PRD
|3,607||0.07||—||||7||—||0||—
|-
| 
|2,768||0.06||0.4||||1||3||0||0
|-
|  
|2,424||0.05||—||||0||—||0||—
|-
|style="width: 8px" bgcolor=#0093DD align="center" |
|align=left|CDS / PS
|953||0.02||—||||1||—||0||—
|-
|style="width: 8px" bgcolor=#008000 align="center" |
|align=left|PRD / MDP/CDE
|710||0.01||—||||1||—||0||—
|-
| 
|349||0.01||—||||0||—||0||—
|-
|colspan=2 align=left style="background-color:#E9E9E9"|Total valid
|width="65" align="right" style="background-color:#E9E9E9"|4,765,968
|width="40" align="right" style="background-color:#E9E9E9"|96.55
|width="40" align="right" style="background-color:#E9E9E9"|0.4
|width="40" align="right" style="background-color:#E9E9E9"|—
|width="45" align="right" style="background-color:#E9E9E9"|2,002
|width="45" align="right" style="background-color:#E9E9E9"|27
|width="45" align="right" style="background-color:#E9E9E9"|305
|width="45" align="right" style="background-color:#E9E9E9"|0
|-
|colspan=2|Blank ballots
|90,114||1.83||0.3||colspan=6 rowspan=4|
|-
|colspan=2|Invalid ballots
|80,328||1.63||0.1
|-
|colspan=2 align=left style="background-color:#E9E9E9"|Total 
|width="65" align="right" style="background-color:#E9E9E9"|4,936,410
|width="40" align="right" style="background-color:#E9E9E9"|100.00
|width="40" align="right" style="background-color:#E9E9E9"|
|-
|colspan=2|Registered voters/turnout
||8,110,493||60.86||2.1
|-
| colspan=11 align=left | Source: Comissão Nacional de Eleições
|}

Municipality map

City control
The following table lists party control in all district capitals, as well as in municipalities above 100,000 inhabitants. Population estimates from the 1981 Census.

Municipal Assemblies

National summary of votes and seats

|-
! rowspan="2" colspan=2 style="background-color:#E9E9E9" align=left|Parties
! rowspan="2" style="background-color:#E9E9E9" align=right|Votes
! rowspan="2" style="background-color:#E9E9E9" align=right|%
! rowspan="2" style="background-color:#E9E9E9" align=right|±pp swing
! rowspan="2" style="background-color:#E9E9E9" align=right|Candidacies
! colspan="2" style="background-color:#E9E9E9" align="center"|Mandates
|- style="background-color:#E9E9E9"
! style="background-color:#E9E9E9" align="center"|Total
! style="background-color:#E9E9E9" align="center"|±
|- 
| 
|align=right|1,574,632
|align=right|31.92
|align=right|7.6
|align=right|
|align=right|2,429
|align=right|633
|-
| 
|align=right|1,544,877
|align=right|31.32
|align=right|1.7
|align=right|
|align=right|2,573
|align=right|98
|-  
| 
|align=right|657,499
|align=right|13.33
|align=right|7.0
|align=right|
|align=right|849
|align=right|207
|-
| 
|align=right|443,731
|align=right|9.00
|align=right|7.2
|align=right|
|align=right|712
|align=right|303
|-
|style="width: 10px" bgcolor=#FF9900 align="center" | 
|align=left|PSD / CDS / PPM
|align=right|195,249
|align=right|3.96
|align=right|—
|align=right|
|align=right|41
|align=right|—
|-
|style="width: 10px" bgcolor=#FF66FF align="center" | 
|align=left|PS / CDU / MDP/CDE
|align=right|182,237 	
|align=right|3.69
|align=right|—
|align=right|
|align=right|28
|align=right|—
|-
| 
|align=right| 41,085
|align=right| 0.83
|align=right|4.4
|align=right|
|align=right|26
|align=right|247
|-
|style="width: 10px" bgcolor=#FF66FF align="center" | 
|align=left|PS / CDS
|align=right|34,043
|align=right|0.69
|align=right|—
|align=right|
|align=right|41
|align=right|—
|-
|style="width: 10px" bgcolor=red align="center" | 
|align=left|CDU / PRD
|align=right|23,456
|align=right|0.48
|align=right|—
|align=right|
|align=right|18
|align=right|—
|-
|style="width: 10px" bgcolor=#E2062C align="center" | 
|align=left|People's Democratic Union
|align=right|17,706	
|align=right|0.36
|align=right|0.3
|align=right|
|align=right|14
|align=right|0
|-
| 
|align=right|11,029
|align=right|0.22
|align=right|0.1
|align=right|
|align=right|0
|align=right|0
|-
| 
|align=right|9,239
|align=right|0.19
|align=right|—
|align=right|
|align=right|6
|align=right|—
|-
| 
|align=right|4,250
|align=right|0.09
|align=right|0.0
|align=right|
|align=right|3
|align=right|1
|-
|style="width: 10px" bgcolor=darkred align="center" | 
|align=left|MDP/CDE / PRD
|align=right|2,762
|align=right|0.06
|align=right|—
|align=right|
|align=right|4
|align=right|—
|-
| 
|align=right|1,859
|align=right|0.04
|align=right| 0.3
|align=right| 
|align=right| 2
|align=right| 5
|-
| 
|align=right|1,355 	
|align=right| 0.03
|align=right|—
|align=right|
|align=right|1
|align=right|—
|-
|style="width: 8px" bgcolor=#0093DD align="center" |
|align=left|CDS / PS
|align=right|982
|align=right| 0.02
|align=right|—
|align=right|
|align=right|4
|align=right|—
|-
|style="width: 8px" bgcolor=#008000 align="center" |
|align=left|PRD / MDP/CDE
|align=right|505
|align=right| 0.01
|align=right|—
|align=right|
|align=right|2
|align=right|—
|-
|colspan=2 align=left style="background-color:#E9E9E9"|Total valid
|width="65" align="right" style="background-color:#E9E9E9"|4,722,468
|width="40" align="right" style="background-color:#E9E9E9"|96.22
|width="40" align="right" style="background-color:#E9E9E9"|0.4
|width="40" align="right" style="background-color:#E9E9E9"|—
|width="45" align="right" style="background-color:#E9E9E9"|6,753
|width="45" align="right" style="background-color:#E9E9E9"|81
|-
|colspan=2|Blank ballots
|104,261||2.12||0.2||colspan=6 rowspan=4|
|-
|colspan=2|Invalid ballots
|81,410||1.66||0.2
|-
|colspan=2 align=left style="background-color:#E9E9E9"|Total
|width="65" align="right" style="background-color:#E9E9E9"|4,908,139
|width="40" align="right" style="background-color:#E9E9E9"|100.00
|width="40" align="right" style="background-color:#E9E9E9"|
|-
|colspan=2|Registered voters/turnout
||8,211,821||59.77||3.4
|-
| colspan=11 align=left | Source: Comissão Nacional de Eleições
|}

Parish Assemblies

National summary of votes and seats

|-
! rowspan="2" colspan=2 style="background-color:#E9E9E9" align=left|Parties
! rowspan="2" style="background-color:#E9E9E9" align=right|Votes
! rowspan="2" style="background-color:#E9E9E9" align=right|%
! rowspan="2" style="background-color:#E9E9E9" align=right|±pp swing
! rowspan="2" style="background-color:#E9E9E9" align=right|Candidacies
! colspan="2" style="background-color:#E9E9E9" align="center"|Mandates
! colspan="2" style="background-color:#E9E9E9" align="center"|Presidents
|- style="background-color:#E9E9E9"
! style="background-color:#E9E9E9" align="center"|Total
! style="background-color:#E9E9E9" align="center"|±
! style="background-color:#E9E9E9" align="center"|Total
! style="background-color:#E9E9E9" align="center"|±
|-
| 
|1,556,509||31.69||1.2||||13,237||119||||
|-
| 
|1,522,653||31.00||4.0||||11,188||2,149||||
|-
| 
|668,608||13.61||6.6||||2,925||751||||
|-
| 
|397,164||8.09||2.4||||3,444||1,087||||
|-
|style="width: 10px" bgcolor=#FF9900 align="center" | 
|align=left|PSD / CDS / PPM
|189,335||3.86||—||||403||—||||—
|-
|style="width: 10px" bgcolor=#FF66FF align="center" | 
|align=left|PS / CDU / MDP/CDE
|183,404||3.73||—||||392||—||||—
|-
|style="width: 8px" bgcolor=gray align="center" |
|align=left|Independents
|91,533||1.86||0.5||||1,009||212||||
|-
|style="width: 10px" bgcolor=#FF66FF align="center" | 
|align=left|PS / CDS
|32,109||0.65||—||||181||—||||—
|-
| 
|29,684||0.60||2.8|||||58||668||||
|-
|style="width: 10px" bgcolor=#E2062C align="center" | 
|align=left|People's Democratic Union
|24,324||0.50||0.1||||30||4||||
|-
|style="width: 10px" bgcolor=red align="center" | 
|align=left|CDU / PRD
|22,713||0.46||—||||95||—||||—
|-
| 
|7,610||0.15||—||||13||—||||
|-
| 
|4,576||0.09||0.0||||0||0||||
|-
| 
|1,247||0.03||0.0||||9||15||||
|-
| 
|1,162 ||0.02||—||||3||—||||—
|-
| 
|1,068||0.02||0.0||||7||3||||
|-
|style="width: 10px" bgcolor=darkred align="center" | 
|align=left|MDP/CDE / PRD
|952||0.02||—||||5||—||||—
|-
|style="width: 8px" bgcolor=#008000 align="center" |
|align=left|PRD / MDP/CDE
|213||0.00||—||||1||—||||—
|-
|colspan=2 align=left style="background-color:#E9E9E9"|Total valid
|width="65" align="right" style="background-color:#E9E9E9"|4,731,554
|width="40" align="right" style="background-color:#E9E9E9"|96.41
|width="40" align="right" style="background-color:#E9E9E9"|0.2
|width="40" align="right" style="background-color:#E9E9E9"|—
|width="45" align="right" style="background-color:#E9E9E9"|33,000
|width="45" align="right" style="background-color:#E9E9E9"|1,059
|width="45" align="right" style="background-color:#E9E9E9"|
|width="45" align="right" style="background-color:#E9E9E9"|
|-
|colspan=2|Blank ballots
|90,606||1.85||0.0||colspan=6 rowspan=4|
|-
|colspan=2|Invalid ballots
|85,834||1.75||0.2
|-
|colspan=2 align=left style="background-color:#E9E9E9"|Total
|width="65" align="right" style="background-color:#E9E9E9"|4,907,994
|width="40" align="right" style="background-color:#E9E9E9"|100.00
|width="40" align="right" style="background-color:#E9E9E9"|
|-
|colspan=2|Registered voters/turnout
||8,882,933||55.25||8.3
|-
| colspan=11 align=left | Source: Comissão Nacional de Eleições 
|}

See also
 Politics of Portugal
 List of political parties in Portugal
 Elections in Portugal

References

External links
 Official results site, Portuguese Justice Ministry
 Portuguese Electoral Commission

1989 elections in Portugal
1989
December 1989 events in Europe